Sir William Whytehead Boulton, 1st Baronet DL (10 January 1873 – 9 January 1949) was a British soldier and Conservative Party politician.

Background
Boulton was the son of William Whytehead Boulton and his wife Mary Hudleston Gibson, daughter of John Gibson. He was privately educated.

Career
Boulton served as lieutenant in the Royal Horse Guards and became a major in the 7th Volunteer Battalion, Essex Regiment. He entered the House of Commons in 1931, sitting as a Member of Parliament (MP) for Sheffield Central until 1945.  Boulton was appointed a Lord Commissioner of the Treasury in 1940, a post he held for two years. He subsequently was a Government Whip as Vice-Chamberlain of the Household until 1944. On 30 June, he was created a baronet, of Braxted Park in the County of Essex. Boulton represented Essex as a Deputy Lieutenant.

Family
On 23 April 1903, he married Rosalind Mary Milburn, daughter of Sir John Milburn, 1st Baronet. They had four sons. Boulton died in 1949, aged 75, and was succeeded in the baronetcy successively by his eldest son Edward and then by his third son William.

References

External links

1873 births
1949 deaths
Baronets in the Baronetage of the United Kingdom
William
Conservative Party (UK) MPs for English constituencies
Deputy Lieutenants of Essex
Essex Regiment officers
Ministers in the Chamberlain wartime government, 1939–1940
Ministers in the Churchill wartime government, 1940–1945
Royal Horse Guards officers
UK MPs 1931–1935
UK MPs 1935–1945
20th-century British Army personnel